Omalium caesum is a species of rove beetles native to Europe.

References

Staphylinidae
Beetles described in 1806
Beetles of Europe